The Igo Senshuken was a Go competition.

Outline 

The final of the Igo Senshuken was decided in a best-of-five match. Each player had 6 hours to think. The challengers came from a knock-out with 16 players.

Past winners and runners-up

References 

Go competitions in Japan